Stanley Adams may refer to:

 Stanley Adams (singer) (1907–1994), American singer and lyricist
 Stanley Adams (actor) (1915–1977), American actor and screenwriter
 Stanley T. Adams (1922–1999), American Army officer, recipient of the Medal of Honor during the Korean War
 Stanley Adams (whistleblower) (born c. 1927), pharmaceutical company executive and corporate whistleblower
 Stan Adams (born 1960), American football player